Metarctia burra is a moth of the  subfamily Arctiinae. It is found in many African countries from Sierra Leone to Somalia down to South Africa.

References

Metarctia
Moths of Africa
Insects of Uganda
Fauna of the Republic of the Congo